Columbia is a ghost town in Yavapai County, Arizona, United States.

References

External links
 
 
 Columbia – ghosttowns.com

Ghost towns in Arizona
Former populated places in Yavapai County, Arizona